Tardini may refer to:
Domenico Tardini (1888-1961), a former Cardinal Secretary of State
Ennio Tardini (1879-1923), an Italian lawyer and former president of Parma F.C.
Fanny Tardini-Vladicescu (1823-1908), a Romanian opera singer and stage actor
Stadio Ennio Tardini, the stadium of Parma F.C. named after Ennio Tardini